KOKE is an Austin, Texas radio station, operating at 1600 kHz, licensed to Pflugerville, Texas, and is owned by Encino Broadcasting LLC. The station currently airs a Tejano format.

Overview 

KOKE was purchased by Encino Broadcasting LLC, along with KELG and KTXZ on September 24, 2007.

The station was originally licensed as KVYK until June 16, 1995 when the callsign was changed to 
KOKE.

From 2004 to 2007 the station was owned by Border Media Partners and served as a progressive talk radio station and Air America Radio affiliate.

After that it broadcast Regional Mexican for a few years, however by 2019 it had flipped to Tejano music replacing KTXZ 1560 which dropped the format.

Personalities 

 "Federico Castro"
 "Primo Pablo"

References

External links 

OKE
Radio stations established in 1985
1985 establishments in Texas